"Money" is a house song performed by French DJ David Guetta, featuring vocals from singer Chris Willis and rapper Moné. The track was released as the lead single from Guetta's second studio album, Guetta Blaster on 9 April 2004. The single was not released in the United Kingdom. A music video for the track exists, but it does not feature Guetta, Willis or Mone. It features a tutorial on printing fake money. The single achieved its best success on the Belgian Singles Chart, peaking at number 12 there. it also has parts of rock guitar

Track listing
 French CD single
 "Money" (extended version) – 4:45
 "Money" (Wally Lopez Remix) – 3:33
 "Money" (Dancefloor Killa Remix) – 3:47
 "Money" (radio edit) – 3:05

Charts

Notes

2004 singles
Chris Willis songs
David Guetta songs
Songs written by Joachim Garraud
Songs written by David Guetta
2004 songs
Perfecto Records singles
Song recordings produced by David Guetta